Pierre Vilar  (3 May 1906, Frontignan – 7 August 2003, Saint-Palais) was a French historian specialized in the history of Catalonia and Hispanism. He is considered one of the most authoritative 20th-century historians for the history of Spain, for both the Ancien Régime and modern history. He and Jaume Vicens Vives were among the most influential historians of Catalonia.

His short 1947 essay Histoire de l'Espagne (History of Spain), despite being banned under Francoism, has a great success, and after the death of the Francisco Franco was frequently used in progressive circles and for teaching. In 2009, it reached its 22nd edition.

Works
  1947: Histoire de l'Espagne.
  1959: Le déclin catalan du bas Moyen Âge. Hypothèses sur sa chronologie
  1962: La Catalogne dans l'Espagne moderne. Recherches sur les fondements économiques des structures nationales
  1965: Growth and development
  1969: L’Or et la Monnaie dans l’histoire (1450–1920)
  1975: Assaigs sobre la Catalunya del segle XVIII
  1975: Marxist history, history in construction
  1980: Introduction to the vocabulary of the historical analysis
  1986: La guerre d'Espagne
  1987–1990: Història de Catalunya 
  1995: Pensar històricament. Reflexions i records.
  1998: History, nation and nationalism: a national question and labour movement.

Pierre Vilar Collection 
The Pierre Vilar Collection of the Universitat de Girona (UdG) is the personal library of the historian, given by his family in 2006. It consists of more than 6,500 20th and 19th century books and 331 journal series, with some of the volumes signed and dedicated by its authors. The collection is located at the UdG Library. Barri Vell campus.

Cataloguing of the collection was completed in 2006 in the context of the centennial of Pierre Vilar's birth.

This collection with those of Jaume Vicens Vives, Joan Reglà, Ramon Garrabou, Jordi Nadal, Joaquim Nadal  i Lluís Maria de Puig, confer to the UdG a great significance as center for historical research in Catalunya.

References

External links 
Pierre Vilar Collection (Universitat de Girona)

French Hispanists
1906 births
2003 deaths
French male non-fiction writers
20th-century French historians
Members of the Institute for Catalan Studies
French Marxist historians